C More Emotion was a Scandinavian premium television channel showing movies aimed at women.

References

Defunct television channels in Sweden
Defunct television channels in Norway
Defunct television channels in Denmark
Defunct television channels in Finland
Television channels and stations established in 2011
Television channels and stations disestablished in 2017
Pan-Nordic television channels